"March On, Bahamaland" is the national anthem of the Bahamas. Timothy Gibson composed the music and authored the lyrics. It was adopted as the national anthem in 1973, when the country gained independence from the United Kingdom.

History
The Bahamas became a crown colony within the British Empire in 1717. Internal autonomy was eventually granted to the islands in 1964. Negotiations on independence commenced eight years later, when the Progressive Liberal Party emerged victorious in the 1972 elections after campaigning in favour of sovereignty. Consequently, a contest was held to determine an anthem for the forthcoming state.

In the end, lyrics and music written by Timothy Gibson were selected. Gibson was a school music teacher and also wrote the music to the country's national song, "God Bless Our Sunny Clime", together with E. Clement Bethel. The song was officially adopted in 1973, the year the country gained independence. One of the first public occasions where the anthem was played was at the midnight flag hoisting ceremony held at Clifford Park in Nassau on 10 July 1973, marking the end of British rule over the Bahamas.

Since the Bahamas continued to be a Commonwealth realm after independence, "God Save the Queen" was retained as the country's royal anthem. That anthem was twice played by mistake at the 1982 Commonwealth Games medal ceremony, when Shonel Ferguson won gold in women's long jump. She stepped off the podium on each occasion and expressed her wish that "March On, Bahamaland" be played. The officials realized that they did not have a recording of that song, so the Bahamian delegation sang their anthem themselves.

Lyrics
Source:

References

External links
 Audio of "March On, Bahamaland", with information and lyrics (archive link)
 "March On, Bahamaland" MIDI

Bahamian songs
March music
National anthems
National symbols of the Bahamas
North American anthems
Year of song unknown